The 1992–93 George Mason Patriots Men's basketball team represented George Mason University during the 1992–93 NCAA Division I men's basketball season. This was the 27th season for the program, the fifth and final under head coach Ernie Nestor. The Patriots played their home games at the Patriot Center in Fairfax, Virginia.

Honors and awards 

Colonial Athletic Association All-Rookie Team
 Troy Manns

Player statistics

Schedule and results

|-
!colspan=12 style=| Non-conference regular season

|-
!colspan=12 style=|CAA regular season

|-
!colspan=12 style=|1993 CAA tournament

References

George Mason Patriots men's basketball seasons
George Mason men's basketball
George Mason men's basketball
George Mason